Lake Abitibi is a shallow lake in northeastern Ontario and western Quebec, Canada. The lake, which lies within the vast Clay Belt, is separated in two distinct portions by a short narrows, making it actually 2 lakes. The lake is shallow and studded with islands. Its shores and vicinity are covered with small timber.

Its outlet is the Abitibi River, a tributary of the Moose River, which empties into James Bay.  The lake takes its name from the river.  "Abitibi" comes from the Algonquin words abitah, meaning middle and nipi meaning water, possibly a reference to its geographic location between the Harricana (from the Algonquin word Nanikana, meaning "the main way") to the east and the Kapuskasing–Mattagami river system to the west.

Water levels on the lake are influenced by the Twin Falls Dam on the Abitibi River.

Portions of Lake Abitibi's southern shores and a section of the Abitibi River are part of the Abitibi-de-Troyes Provincial Park. The islands in Ontario's portion of the lake are protected in the Lake Abitibi Islands Provincial Park. The entire McDougall Point Peninsula, that separates the lake in two, is part of the  Mcdougal Point Peninsula Conservation Reserve.

Pointe Abitibi at the mouth of the Duparquet River is a National Historic Site of Canada. This  site, known as Apitipik National Historic Site of Canada, was a summer gathering place for the Abitibiwinnik until 1956 and the location of several trading posts between 1686 and 1922.

History

Application of Abitibi to describe the lake and the people living in the area around it was first noted in The Jesuit Relations in 1640.  One of the first Europeans in this area was Pierre de Troyes, who built a post on Lake Abitibi when he was on his way to capture English HBC posts on James Bay in 1686.  The Abitibi Post lay halfway between trading posts on James Bay and those on the Ottawa River and was in continuous existence throughout the French period.

The lake was part of the canoe route from James Bay to Montreal, via the Moose and Abitibi Rivers, then a series of intermediate streams and portages to Lake Temiskaming and the Ottawa River.

After the British conquered Canada in 1763, free traders either took over the French fort or built another post on the lake, providing strong trading competition to the main Hudson's Bay Company (HBC) fort at Moose Factory and the HBC outpost at Frederick House. This moved the HBC to set up a post, called Abitibi House, on Lake Abitibi in 1794, located on the peninsula at the mouth of the Duparquet River. In subsequent decades this post, as well as competing posts of the North West Company, were rebuilt or moved to various locations around the lake and its islands. Being unproductive due to competition, the HBC abandoned Abitibi House in 1811. When two companies merged in 1821, the HBC took over the trading post of the North West Company on Lake Abitibi.

The construction of the Grand Trunk Pacific Railway (now Canadian National Railway) through this district made it of some importance at the start of the 20th century.

Lake Abitibi Islands

The Lake Abitibi Islands Provincial Park protects nearly all the islands on the Ontario side of Lake Abitibi. Some of the larger islands are Deer, Dominion, and St. Patrick, as well as the Mistaken Islands (the largest island in the lake, Nepawa Island, is not part of the park since it is in Clerval, Quebec). The park was created in 2005 when the Abitibi-De-Troyes Provincial Park was reconfigured.

The park is an important nesting habitat for many bird species, including great blue heron, bald eagle, osprey, and double-crested cormorant. The vegetation is characterized by intolerant hardwood and mixedwood forests, with black spruce, white spruce, and white birch as the common tree species.

It is a non-operating park, meaning that there are no facilities or services, and only accessible via air or water.

See also
Pont de l'Île - covered bridge connecting Nepawa Island to the mainland
Wahgoshig First Nation
Blake River Megacaldera Complex
List of lakes in Ontario

Notes

References

External links

Canadian Model Forests Network

Abitibi
Abitibi
Abitibi
Borders of Ontario
Borders of Quebec